Elections to the Madhya Pradesh Legislative Assembly were held in May 1980. The Indian National Congress won a majority of seats and Arjun Singh was sworn in as the new Chief Minister.

After the 1972 Madhya Pradesh Legislative Assembly election, the number of constituencies in Madhya Pradesh were increased to 320, following the recommendation of the Delimitation Commission of India.

Result 
Sources:

Elected Members

References

1980
1980
Madhya Pradesh